Arizona Charlie's Decatur is a 258-room hotel and casino with a  locals casino in the Charleston Heights area of Las Vegas, Nevada, United States. It is owned and operated by Golden Entertainment.

History
Arizona Charlie's Decatur (and Arizona Charlie's Boulder) are the results of original efforts by the Becker family, long established developers in Las Vegas. In 1963, just south of a shopping project on Decatur, between Charleston Boulevard and what was formerly West Fremont Street (presently now US 95), the Becker family built Charleston Heights Bowling, a bowling alley with 36 lanes and slot machines. Their son Bruce Becker came to Las Vegas in 1971 and was put in charge of running Charleston Heights Bowling. He made the decision to expand the bowling alley into a casino. The casino's namesake was a distant relative, "Arizona" Charlie Meadows, a performer in Buffalo Bill's Wild West Show. The $18 million casino resort opened in April 1988. It underwent a $40 million expansion in 1994, when the 31-year-old bowling alley, Vons supermarket and former location of Pistol Pete's/Peter Piper's Pizza were demolished to make way for a larger casino, quickly becoming a neighborhood favorite and local's hangout.

In November 1997 investor Carl Icahn bought a majority of Arizona Charlie's mortgage notes, making him the bankrupt resort's largest creditor. Icahn fought for control of Arizona Charlie's throughout the bankruptcy process. In July 1998, Bruce Becker's $92 million loan from United Healthcare collapsed and ownership of the property passed to Carl Icahn and American Casino & Entertainment Properties (ACEP). In January 2000, American Casino & Entertainment Properties purchased Sunrise Suites on Clark County's Boulder Highway for $43.3 million. The property was renamed Arizona Charlie's Boulder, as a companion name to Arizona Charlie's Decatur.

In October 2017, Golden Entertainment closed its $850 million purchase of American Casino & Entertainment Properties which expanded the company's casino portfolio by four: the Stratosphere Las Vegas, Arizona Charlie's Boulder, Arizona Charlie's Decatur and the Aquarius Casino Resort.

See also
 Arizona Charlie's Boulder

References

External links

 Arizona Charlie's website
 Becker enterprises, founder of Arizona Charlie's

1988 establishments in Nevada
Casino hotels
Casinos in the Las Vegas Valley
Golden Entertainment
Hotel buildings completed in 1988
Hotels in Las Vegas